The Bucharest Open established in 2014 was a professional tennis tournament played on outdoor clay courts in Bucharest, Romania. It was part of the Women's Tennis Association (WTA) Tour. It was held annually in July at the Arenele BNR the week after the Wimbledon.

Past finals

Singles

Doubles

See also  
BRD Năstase Țiriac Trophy

References

External links 
Official website 

 
WTA Tour
Clay court tennis tournaments
Tennis tournaments in Romania
Sports competitions in Bucharest
Recurring sporting events established in 2014

ru:Открытый чемпионат Румынии по теннису среди женщин